These quarterbacks have started for the Oregon Ducks. They are listed in order of the date of each player's first start at quarterback.

Starting quarterbacks
These are the quarterbacks who had the most starts for the season. Note: game statistics include bowl game results.

References

https://www.sports-reference.com/cfb/players/joey-harrington-1.html 

Oregon Ducks

Oregon Ducks quarterbacks